The Man Who Liked Funerals is a 1959 British comedy film starring Leslie Phillips, Susan Beaumont and Bill Fraser. It was directed by David Eady and written by Margot Bennett, Cecily Finn and Joan O'Connor. The film was released in the United Kingdom in January 1959.

Synopsis

In order to help a youth club which is under threat of closure, a man begins attending funerals where he blackmails the relatives of the recently deceased, threatening to publish incriminating stories about them. However, his plans encounter problems when he tries to blackmail the family of a prominent villain.

Cast
 Leslie Phillips as Simon Hurd 
 Susan Beaumont as Stella 
 Bill Fraser as Jeremy Bentham 
 Thelma Ruby as Junior Mistress 
 Mary Mackenzie as Hester Waring 
 Paul Stassino as Nick Morelli 
 Jimmy Thompson as Lieutenant Hunter 
 Charles Clay as Colonel Hunter 
 Anita Sharp-Bolster as Lady Hunter 
 Shaun O'Riordan as Reverend Pitt 
 Marianne Stone as Bentham's secretary

Critical reception
It was one of 15 films selected by Steve Chibnall and Brian McFarlane in The British 'B' Film, their survey of British B films, as among the most meritorious of the B films made in Britain between World War II and 1970. They describe it as "fresh and gently funny", "consistently amusing, its plot worked out with some wit" and add that "its cast, amiably led by Phillips at the start of his starring career, enters into the spirit of the joke".

References

External links

1959 films
British black-and-white films
British comedy films
Films directed by David Eady
1959 comedy films
1950s English-language films
1950s British films